William John Dumbrell (1926 – 1 October 2016) was an Australian biblical scholar.

Dumbrell was converted in 1951, and studied at Moore Theological College before being ordained as priest in the Anglican church in February 1957. He undertook further studies at the University of Sydney (M.A., 1958), the University of London (B.D. and M.Th.) and Harvard University (Th.D., 1969). Dumbrell had served on the faculty of Regent College, Macquarie University, Moore Theological College, the University of Sydney, Trinity Theological College, Singapore and Emmaus Bible College.

In 2010, a Festschrift was published in his honour, An Everlasting Covenant: Biblical and Theological Essays in Honour of William J. Dumbrell, which included contributions from Bruce Waltke and Allan Harman. He died in Sydney on 1 October 2016. Michael Jensen suggests that, along with that of Donald Robinson and Graeme Goldsworthy, Dumbrell's work "has been crucial for shaping how Sydney Anglicans think about and preach from the Bible."

References

1926 births
2016 deaths
Harvard Divinity School alumni
Academic staff of Macquarie University
Academic staff of Moore Theological College
Academic staff of the University of Sydney
Moore Theological College alumni
University of Sydney alumni
Alumni of the University of London
Australian Anglican priests
Australian biblical scholars
Old Testament scholars
Anglican biblical scholars
Australian expatriates in the United States
Australian expatriates in the United Kingdom